Kuzminskaya is a rural locality (a village) in Kemskoye Rural Settlement, Vytegorsky District, Vologda Oblast, Russia. The population was 1 as of 2002.

Geography 
Kuzminskaya is located 98 km east of Vytegra (the district's administrative centre) by road. Novaya is the nearest rural locality.

References 

Rural localities in Vytegorsky District